Kasperi Nuto (born: 31 August 1995) is a Finnish ice hockey player that currently serves as the captain of Karhu HT. Nuto plays as a winger. Nuto has played 11 Liiga games with Porin Ässät and has one point. Nuto has played for three different Mestis teams and in total has played 17 Mestis games with 3 points. Nuto has played in Karhu HT since 2017.

Football career 
In addition to hockey, Nuto has played football. He won silver with Musan Salama D13 team in the Denmark Soccer Festival -tournament in 2008.

References 

Living people
1995 births
Finnish ice hockey players
Ässät players